Viktor Nikolaevich Bondarev (born 7 December 1959) is a Colonel General and former Commander of the Russian Aerospace Forces (1 August 2015 – 26 September 2017), and the former Commander-in-Chief of the Air Force branch of the Aerospace Forces (6 May 2012 – 1 August 2015). He replaced Alexander Zelin, who was dismissed from the military on 27 April 2012.

Biography
Bondarev's career started off with his joining the Soviet Air Force in 1977. By 1981, he had graduated from the Boris Aviation Training Centre for flight crews in Borisoglebsk, and by 1992 had graduated from the Gagarin Air Force Academy. In 2004, he graduated from the Military Academy of the General Staff.

He was a squadron commander of the Boris Aviation Training Centre before becoming a deputy commander and senior pilot of the Attack Aviation Regiment, and as such, participated in the Soviet–Afghan War. He then became the commander of the 899th Guards Assault Aviation Regiment located in Buturlinovka, Voronezh; the regiment fought in the First and Second Chechen Wars. In 2000, he became the deputy commander, before being appointed the Commander in 2004, of the 105th Composite Air Division, 16th Army Air Force and Air Defense. From May 2006, he became the Deputy Commander of the 14th Army Air Force and Air Defense; he would become the Commander of the branch in June 2008.

In July 2011, Bondarev was appointed Chief of Staff–Deputy Commander of the Russian Air Force.

On 21 April 2000, via a presidential decree, Bondarev was named a Hero of the Russian Federation for engaging in military activities involving significant risks to his life.

References

1959 births
Commanders-in-chief of the Russian Air Force
Russian Air Force generals
Recipients of the Order of Courage
Living people
Russian colonel generals
Military Academy of the General Staff of the Armed Forces of Russia alumni
Heroes of the Russian Federation
Members of the Federation Council of Russia (after 2000)
Russian military personnel of the Syrian civil war